Yellow Rock is a small village or locality in the Blue Mountains region of New South Wales, Australia.

Location and features
It is surrounded by the suburbs of Mount Riverview, Warrimoo and Springwood to the south, Winmalee to the west, Hawkesbury Heights and Yarramundi to the north and northeast respectively, and Castlereagh across the Nepean to the east. Yellow Rock is one of Sydney's most western parts, it is apart of the greater western Sydney region.

Much of the Yellomundee Regional Park is contained within the locality. The Yellomundee Regional Park has bike and walking tracks and stretches north-south on the west side of the Nepean River, and the Yellow Rock lookout at the end of Yellow Rock Road. Frasers Creek flows in a west-northeast direction in the north part of the suburb, passing north of the lookout through the park to the river. The northern border of the suburb is a creek, opposite of which is the Hawkesbury Ridge.

The village of Yellow Rock has a Rural Fire Service station which is a satellite station to Winmalee Rural Fire Brigade; and a Greek Orthodox monastery.

October 2013 bushfires 
The village, surrounding bushland and nearby towns of  Springwood and Winmalee were badly affected by bushfires in October 2013. 200 residential properties were destroyed, and 198 damaged in those localities, including a significant number in Yellow Rock.

References

External links
Winmalee Rural Fire Brigade

Suburbs of the City of Blue Mountains